The Yale Steam Laundry is a historic residence located on 437–443 New York Avenue, Northwest, Washington, D.C., in the Mount Vernon Square neighborhood.

History
The original Yale Steam Laundry complex includes three, Neo-Renaissance, and Colonial Revival facilities built in 1902, 1919, and 1924, to the designs of architect Alfred B. Mullett and Thomas Francis, Jr. The laundry closed in 1976.

The building was redeveloped as condominiums by Scott Fuller, designed by architect John Ronan, and completed in 2008.

The original buildings were listed on the National Register of Historic Places (NRHP) in 1999. In addition, the buildings are designated as contributing properties to the Mount Vernon Square Historic District, listed on the NRHP in 1994.

See also 
 Manhattan Laundry: Another historic laundry in Washington, D.C.

References

External links

http://www.yalelofts.com/

Residential buildings on the National Register of Historic Places in Washington, D.C.
Industrial buildings completed in 1902
Industrial buildings completed in 1919
Industrial buildings completed in 1924
Industrial buildings and structures on the National Register of Historic Places in Washington, D.C.
Former laundry buildings
Mount Vernon Square